Nieradowo  is a village in the administrative district of Gmina Szydłowo, within Mława County, Masovian Voivodeship, in east-central Poland.

The village has a population of 50.

References

Villages in Mława County